Susana Herrera Jordán (26 March 1962 - 2 November 2019) was a ski athlete from Spain.  She was born in Madrid, and lost her sight at the age of 23. She was a type B1 ski athlete.  She raced at the 1988 Winter Paralympics, where she finished first in the downhill race and third in the giant slalom race.

References 

1962 births
2019 deaths
Paralympic gold medalists for Spain
Paralympic bronze medalists for Spain
Sportspeople from Madrid
Alpine skiers at the 1988 Winter Paralympics
Paralympic alpine skiers of Spain
Paralympic medalists in alpine skiing
Medalists at the 1988 Winter Paralympics